Ilut, also spelt ʿAilut, is an Arab local council in the Northern District of Israel. It was declared a local council in 1991.

Ilut is located to the northwest of Nazareth. The town is home to the Ilut Stadium, the home ground of Maccabi Ahi Nazareth.

History
Sherds from the  Middle Bronze Age II and the Iron Age have been found here.

A burial cave  from the Persian  era have been excavated and  Hellenistic  (3rd–2nd centuries BCE), remains have also been found here.

Historical geographer, Samuel Klein (1886–1940), suggested identifying the village with the 2nd century town known as ‘Ayṯoh-lo, mentioned in rabbinical sources and home to one of the 24 priestly families that settled in the Galilee after the Bar Kokhba revolt.

A fish breeding pond, made in Roman era, and in use until the late Byzantine (5th–6th centuries CE)  era have been excavated in the centre of Ilut, near a perennial spring. It was probably used for raising St. Peter's fish. Other building remains, pottery and  coins have also been found dating from the Roman and Byzantine eras.

Remains from  the  Umayyad (7th–8th centuries CE) Fatimid (10th–11th centuries CE) Abbasid  Crusader and Mamluk (13th–15th centuries CE) eras have also been found here.

Ottoman Empire 
The population was 9 households, all Muslim. They paid a tax rate of 25%  on agricultural products, which included wheat, barley,  fruit trees, goats and beehives, in addition to occasional revenues; a total of 200 Akçe. A map from Napoleon's invasion of 1799 by Pierre Jacotin  showed the place as an unnamed village.

In 1838, it was noted as a Muslim and Greek Christian village in the Nazareth district.

In 1859, the village had a population of 180 souls.

In 1875 Victor Guérin found it to have no more than 200 inhabitants. The village was situated in a valley and on the lower flanks of a mound. Some gardens surrounded it,  planted with fig and olive trees and surrounded by a cactus hedge. He further noticed, near a Oualy, the site of an old church which had been completely razed. There were  only five or six sections of limestone columns lying on the ground. As for the Oualy, it seemed to have been built with materials from the church. The Moslems there worshipped inside it a tomb dedicated to Neby Louth; the same person  whose tomb was found in Bani Na'im.

A population list from about 1887 showed that  Ailut had about  350 Muslim inhabitants.

British Mandate 
At the time of the 1922 census of Palestine ʿAilut had a population of 501, all Muslims, increasing  in  the 1931 census to 834, still all Muslims,  in a total of 165  houses.

In the 1945 statistics the population was 1,310, all Muslims, while the total land area was 17,557 dunams, according to an official land and population survey. Of this, 370  were allocated for plantations and irrigable land, 7,501 for cereals, while 30 dunams were classified as built-up areas.

Israel 
In 2013, an archaeological survey of the southernmost part of the site was conducted by Edna Amos on behalf of the Israel Antiquities Authority (IAA).

See also
 Arab localities in Israel

References

Bibliography

External links
Welcome To 'Illut
Survey of Western Palestine, Map 5:    IAA, Wikimedia commons 

Arab localities in Israel
Local councils in Northern District (Israel)